Annisa Ananda Nusyirwan (born August 14, 1991) is an Indonesian beauty pageant titleholder who was crowned Miss Earth Indonesia 2014 and represented her country at the Miss Earth 2014 pageant.

Early life
Annisa is studying law at Parahyangan Catholic University in Bandung, West Java. Also take master's degree in notary at Padjajaran University in.Bandung. Previously, she was crowned as Bintang Pantene 2012, Top 10 Anggun Cari Bintang Pantene 2011, 2nd Runner-up Gadis Suzuki Sumatera Barat 2008, The Best Performance pemilihan Top Model Riau 2007, 1st Runner-up Fashion Show Don Bosco Fair 2005.

Beauty Pageant

Puteri Indonesia 2011
Annisa was crowned as Puteri Sumatera Barat 2011 and she was competed at Puteri Indonesia 2011 represented West Sumatera. She placed in the Top 10. Meanwhile, the reigning titleholder of Puteri Indonesia was Maria Selena of Central Java and represented Indonesia at Miss Universe 2012 in Las Vegas, United States.

Miss Earth Indonesia 2014
Annisa was crowned as Miss Earth Indonesia 2014 represented West Sumatera.

Miss Earth 2014
Annisa represented Indonesia at Miss Earth 2014 but she was unplaced.

Miss Eco International 2017
Annisa was appointed as Miss Eco Indonesia 2017 and represented Indonesia at Miss Eco International 2017 pageant held in Egypt, at the event She entered Top 10 (6th placed) winning Best Eco Dresser, and also 2nd Runner-up Best National Costume.

References

External links
 Miss Earth Indonesia Official Website

Living people
Miss Earth 2014 contestants
1991 births
Indonesian beauty pageant winners
Indonesian female models
Puteri Indonesia contestants